Sara Benetowa, later known as Sula Benet (23 September 1903 – 12 November 1982), was a Polish anthropologist of the 20th century who studied Polish and Judaic customs and traditions.

Biography
Born in Warsaw, then part of the Russian Empire, Benet was fascinated with Polish peasant culture from her early youth.  This interest eventually led her to enroll as a student of literature and philosophy in the Faculty of Humanities in the University of Warsaw, graduating with a degree in anthropology in 1935. She then attended graduate school at Columbia University, where she received her doctorate in 1944. Also at this time (1936) she first made known at a seminar in Warsaw her theory that "calamus" in the Bible is hemp. Benet died in New York in 1982.

Cannabis research
Based on similar words in cognate languages (Sanskrit śana, Assyrian qunnabu, Persian kenab, Arabic kanab), Benet proposed that the Biblical plants or spices "kaneh" (Ez. 27:19; Is. 43:24; Ct. 4:14), "kaneh ha-tob" (Je. 6:20), and "kaneh-bosem" (Ex. 30:23), which are usually translated as "sweet calamus" or "sweet cane", were actually hemp. "Kaneh-bosem" was an ingredient of the holy anointing oil described in Ex. 30:22-25.

Benet argued that in many ancient languages, including Hebrew, the root "kan" had a double meaning, both hemp and reed, and that an error originated within the oldest Greek translation of the Hebrew Bible, Septuagint, in the third century B.C., where the terms "kaneh" and "kaneh-bosem" had been translated as "sweet kalamos". In the many Bible translations that followed, including Martin Luther's, this translation was repeated. Benet further claimed that the Scythians, who were described by Herodotus as ritual hemp users in the fifth century B.C., were at least one millennium older than has been previously assumed.

Sulah Benet's claim has found little support in the academic community among lexicographers and botanists. The standard reference lexicons of Biblical Hebrew, and reference works on Hebrew Bible plants by scholars such as University of Jerusalem botanist Michael Zohary mention Benet's suggestion, while others argue the word refers to an either different species of hemp or a different plant entirely. Celsius (Hierobotanicon) has suggested sweet flag (Acorus calamus), which grows in Egypt, Judaea, and Syria, containing in its stalk a soft white pith with an agreeable aromatic smell, and forming an ingredient of the richest perfumes. Royle identified the "sweet cane" (A.V.) of Scripture (Is. 43:24; Je. 6:20) with the Andropogon calamus, a plant extensively cultivated in India, from which an oil, deemed to be the famous spikenard of antiquity, is extracted. According to Boissier (Flora Orientalis), "kaneh" was the common marsh reed, Arundo donax L. Some biblical scholars and botanists believe that the qaneh is probably sugarcane.

Works
 Konopie w wierzeniach i zwyczajach ludowych (1936)
 Song, Dance, and Customs of Peasant Poland (1951)
 Festive recipes and festival menus (1957)
 Riddles of many lands Carl Withers, Sula Benet (1956)
 Early Diffusion and Folk Uses of Hemp (1967)
 Abkhasians: the long-living people of the Caucasus (1974)
 How to live to be 100: the life-style of the people of the Caucasus (1976)

References

External links
Sula Benet's papers in the New York University archives.

Further reading
Booth, M. (2003). Cannabis: A History. Doubleday. .

Polish anthropologists
Polish women anthropologists
Cannabis researchers
1903 births
1982 deaths
University of Warsaw alumni
Columbia University alumni
Cannabis and Judaism
Polish women academics
Polish biblical scholars
20th-century anthropologists